The Casals Festival is a classical music event celebrated every year in San Juan, Puerto Rico, in honor of classical musician Pablo Casals.

Background
The festival was founded in 1956 by Pablo Casals. It was promoted by Teodoro Moscoso and David Ogilvy with the objectives of changing the image of Puerto Rico and promoting tourism to the island during off-peak tourism time. After implementing Operation Bootstrap, Teodoro Moscoso employed advertiser David Ogilvy to propagate the image of a people engaged in a cultural renaissance. Teodoro Moscoso's decisive actions at critical junctures (such as his success in pushing tax exemptions and tourism in the late 1940s) and his personal persuasiveness, as with Pablo Casals, who at the age of 80 was persuaded to establish the Casals Festival at San Juan.

Pablo Casals
Pablo Casals (1876–1973), was born in Spain to a Puerto Rican mother Pilar Defilló. He was a cello player and a supporter of the Spanish Republican Government and as such came to odds with Generalisimo Francisco Franco when the Spanish Republican Government was overthrown. Casals went to live in the French village of Prades. There he established the Prades Festival. Casals visited Puerto Rico in 1955 and in 1956

In 1956, Casals moved permanently to the island. He was scheduled to inaugurate the festival which bears his name. The inauguration of the festival was held in the University of Puerto Rico Theater. Casals, who was supposed to perform Suite Number 3 in C major, for solo cello by Johann Sebastian Bach, fell ill and suffered a heart attack during the rehearsals. Even though Casals was hospitalized, the event went on as scheduled with the performance of pianist Rudolf Serkin.

When the festival first started, the majority of the musicians contracted by the festival orchestra for the event came from the United States. Some of the exceptions to this practice were Jesús María Sanromá, Henry Hutchinson Sr., Fernando Valenti and Narciso Figueroa and his brothers. By 1970, the majority of the members of the festival's orchestra were Puerto Ricans.

Participants

Amongst the musical directors who have participated in the festival besides Casals are Mstislav Rostropovich, Leonard Bernstein, Zubin Mehta, Eugene Ormandy, Sir John Barbirolli, Yehudi Menuhin and recently Krzysztof Penderecki.

The artistic direccion of the festival has been under the following "maestros" at one time or another: Jorge Mester, Odón Alonso, Mstislav Rostropovich, Krzysztof Penderecki, Elías López Sobá, Justino Diaz and presently under Maximiano Valdés.

The Casals Festival today

Pablo Casals died on October 22, 1973.  His widow Marta Casals who was the president of the musical committee and Co‑Chairman of the Board and Music Director until 1979, undertook to continue the annual event.  The festival has now taken on a new dimension with the appointment of pianist and scholar Elías López-Sobá and bass/baritone Justino Díaz as artistic and musical directors. These two Puerto Rican artists have continued to follow the legacy of Pablo and Marta Casals, attracting many musicians for a series of concerts. The festival which is now held at the Luis A. Ferre Performing Arts Center in San Juan, celebrated its 50th anniversary in 2006 with a performance of the Philadelphia Orchestra under the musical direction of Maestro Christoph Eschenbach.

The Prades Festival established by Casals in France in 1950 was renamed the Pablo Casals Festival in 1982.

See also

 List of classical music festivals

References

External links
Official Web Site

Classical music festivals in the United States
June events
Classical music festivals in Puerto Rico
1956 establishments in Puerto Rico
Music festivals established in 1956
San Juan, Puerto Rico